Gansevoort Mansion is a historic home located at Gansevoort in Saratoga County, New York.  It was built in 1813 and is two-story, five-bay rectangular building with a gable roof and central entrance.  It features a front verandah with fluted Doric order columns.  It was once used as a Masonic Lodge.  It was built by Herman Gansevoort (1779–1862), son of General Peter Gansevoort (1749–1812) and uncle of the American novelist Herman Melville. It is now operated as an inn and cafe.

It was added to the National Register of Historic Places in 1976.

References

Houses on the National Register of Historic Places in New York (state)
Houses completed in 1813
Houses in Saratoga County, New York
National Register of Historic Places in Saratoga County, New York
Gansevoort family